Dapelogo is a department or commune of Oubritenga Province in northern-central Burkina Faso. Its capital lies at the town of Dapelogo. According to the 1996 census the department has a total population of 36,356.

Towns and villages
 Dapelogo	(6 585 inhabitants) (capital)
 Cissé-yarcé	(791 inhabitants)
 Dié	(2 638 inhabitants)
 Gademtenga	(3 661 inhabitants)
 Garpéné	(952 inhabitants)
 Kouila	(634 inhabitants)
 Manessa	(4 595 inhabitants)
 Nabi-yiri	(192 inhabitants)
 Napalgué	(285 inhabitants)
 Nayambsé	(780 inhabitants)
 Niandeghin	(350 inhabitants)
 Nioniogo	(2 037 inhabitants)
 Ouamzong-Yiri	(117 inhabitants)
 Pagatenga	(774 inhabitants)
 Pighin	(1 326 inhabitants)
 Poédogo	(475 inhabitants)
 Soglozi	(1 651 inhabitants)
 Somnawaye	(770 inhabitants)
 Souka	(684 inhabitants)
 Tamporain	(527 inhabitants)
 Tanghin Niangeghin	(544 inhabitants)
 Tanguiga	(1 561 inhabitants)
 Tigem Koamba	(703 inhabitants)
 Voaga	(3 386 inhabitants)
 Youm-yiri	(338 inhabitants)

References

Departments of Burkina Faso
Oubritenga Province